Richard "Dickie" Roche (1935 - 12 May 2014) was an Irish hurler who played as a goalkeeper for the Waterford senior team.

Born in Waterford, Roche first arrived on the inter-county scene at the age of twenty-one when he first linked up with the senior team. He made his debut during the 19565-57 league. Roche was a regular member of the team for much of the next decade and won one Munster medal. Her was an All-Ireland runner-up on one occasion.

In a club career that spanned four decades Roche won a combined total of sixteen championship medals as a hurler and Gaelic footballer with Mount Sion.

Throughout his career Roche made 5 championship appearances for Waterford. He retired from inter-county hurling following he conclusion of the 1964 championship.

Honours

Team

Mount Sion
Waterford Senior Hurling Championship (13): 1956, 1957, 1958, 1959, 1960, 1961, 1963, 1964, 1965, 1969, 1972, 1974, 1975
Waterford Senior Football Championship (3): 1956, 1959, 1961
Waterford Minor Hurling Championship (1): 1953

Waterford
Munster Senior Hurling Championship (1): 1957

References

1935 births
2014 deaths
Ferrybank hurlers
Mount Sion hurlers
Waterford inter-county hurlers
Waterford inter-county Gaelic footballers
Hurling goalkeepers